The 1964 European Nations' Cup qualifying preliminary round was the first round of the qualifying competition for the 1964 European Nations' Cup. It was contested by 26 of the 29 teams that entered, with Austria, Luxembourg and the Soviet Union receiving a bye to the following round. The winners of each of thirteen home-and-away ties progressed to the round of 16. The matches were played in 1962 and 1963.

Summary

|}

Matches
The thirteen matches took place over two legs, taking place in 1962 and 1963.

Sweden won 3–1 on aggregate and advanced to the round of 16.

Albania was given a 6–0 result on agreggate and advanced to the round of 16 after Greece, having refused to play the tie, withdrew.

Denmark won 9–2 on aggregate and advanced to the round of 16.

Republic of Ireland won 5–3 on aggregate and advanced to the round of 16.

France won 6–3 on aggregate and advanced to the round of 16.

Northern Ireland won 4–0 on aggregate and advanced to the round of 16.

Spain won 7–3 on aggregate and advanced to the round of 16.

Yugoslavia won 4–2 on aggregate and advanced to the round of 16.

4–4 on aggregate. A replay was played on a neutral ground to determine the winner.Bulgaria won 5–4 on aggregate and advanced to the round of 16.Hungary won 4–2 on aggregate and advanced to the round of 16.Netherlands won 4–2 on aggregate and advanced to the round of 16.East Germany won 3–2 on aggregate and advanced to the round of 16.Italy won 7–0 on aggregate and advanced to the round of 16.''

Goalscorers

Notes

References
 
 
 

 1
1962 in Norwegian football
1962 in Swedish football
1962 in Danish football
1962–63 in Republic of Ireland association football
1962–63 in English football
1962–63 in French football
1962–63 in Polish football
1962–63 in Northern Ireland association football
1962–63 in Spanish football
1962–63 in Romanian football
1962–63 in Yugoslav football
1962–63 in Belgian football
1962–63 in Bulgarian football
1962–63 in Portuguese football
1962–63 in Hungarian football
1962–63 in Welsh football
1962–63 in Dutch football
1962–63 in Swiss football
1962–63 in Czechoslovak football
1962–63 in East German football
1962–63 in Italian football
1962–63 in Turkish football
1962–63 in Greek football
1962–63 in Albanian football
Q1
Q1
Q1